Mohabbat Na Kariyo (Don't ever fall in Love) earlier titled Makafaat is a 2019 Pakistani  romantic drama television series produced by master mind productions . It features Hira Mani, Zarnish Khan and Junaid Khan in their second on-screen appearance together after Sun Yaara. It also has Atiqa Odho, Ali Ansari and Mariyam Nafees in supporting roles. It was first aired on 11 October 2019 on Geo Entertainment.

Cast 
Junaid Khan as Asad
Hira Mani as Zara
Zarnish Khan as Rabia
Atiqa Odho as Tasneem, Asad's mother
Ali Ansari as Asad's cousin
Mariyam Nafees as Nida, Asad's sister
Arsalan Faisal as Nida's husband
Farah Nadir as Nida's mother-in-law
Mehmood Akhtar as Zara's father
Shaheen Khan as Zara's mother

Production
The series was earlier titled Makafaat but makers changed it to Mohabbat Na Kariyo to avoid any confusion with the series Makafaat.

References 

2019 Pakistani television series debuts